Senator Preston may refer to:

Francis Preston (1765–1835), Virginia State Senate
James Patton Preston (1774–1843), Virginia State Senate
Jean R. Preston (1935–2013), North Carolina State Senate
John S. Preston (1809–1881), South Carolina State Senate
Platt A. Preston (1837–1900), Washington State Senate
William Ballard Preston (1805–1862), Confederate States Senator from Virginia in 1862
William C. Preston (1794–1860), U.S. Senator from South Carolina from 1833 to 1842